Kenneth Robert John Deuchar (born 6 July 1980) is a Scottish former professional footballer who played as a forward. He is also a practising medical doctor.

In his professional footballing career he played for Falkirk (two spells), East Fife, Gretna, Northampton Town, St Johnstone (two spells), Real Salt Lake, Hamilton Academical, Livingston and Stenhousemuir, when he initially retired for two years before returning to play for Arbroath for a further year.

Footballing career

Youth career
During his youth career, Kenny played for Denny BC, Deanburn BC (Bo'ness), Stenhousemuir Pro Youth, Aberforth Rangers Amateurs (Saturday Amateurs League), Dundee University Medical School AFC, Bonnybridge Juniors, Falkirk Pro Youth.

Falkirk
Deuchar was born in Stirling and began his part-time footballing career at Falkirk, where he made his debut on 10 August 1999 in a Scottish League Challenge Cup match against Stranraer. He scored his first career goal against Inverness Caledonian Thistle.

East Fife
After suffering a string of injuries at Falkirk, including two broken legs, he left to join East Fife. He made his debut for the club on 3 August 2002 against Peterhead, and scored his first goals, a brace on 7 September, against Gretna in a Scottish League Cup match. He led East Fife to promotion, whilst also working as a full-time doctor. During his two seasons with the club he scored thirty four goals in seventy seven appearances.

Gretna
He was offered a place at big spending Scottish Third Division club Gretna, and signed immediately. In his first season, he led Gretna to the Second Division smashing records along the way. He shattered the record for most league goals in a season of 24 with 38 goals in only 30 games. During a friendly against Threave Rovers in 2006 he managed to score eleven goals in an 18–0 thrashing. He did not leave medicine behind completely, as he continued to work one day a week at a Scottish hospital while at Gretna and worked one day a week at Wishaw General Infirmary before his move to the US

Jeff Stelling, host of Sky Sports' Soccer Saturday programme, always made reference to "The Good Doctor" having scored a goal whenever Deuchar's name appeared on the vidiprinter.

During the 2006–07 season, he fell out of favour, but still managed to score 4 goals in 9 matches. On 1 December 2006, Gretna officially announced that Deuchar had requested a transfer.

On 31 January 2007, he joined Northampton Town on loan until the end of the season and on 24 February 2007, Deuchar scored his first goal for Northampton in their 3–0 victory over Rotherham, which was his first goal in English football.

On 5 May 2007, Deuchar's final game for Northampton Town away at Doncaster Rovers, the Northampton fans' held a "Doctor's Day" in his honour and donned white doctors' jackets for the game. Deuchar came on after 63 minutes as a substitute and immediately the Cobblers equalised to draw the game 2–2.

On 30 August 2007, Deuchar joined St Johnstone on emergency loan until 3 December 2007. During this three-month period he scored ten goals in fourteen games and helped the Saints to a Challenge Cup win, their first cup success in their history. He scored one of the goals as St Johnstone won the 2007 Scottish Challenge Cup Final against Dunfermline Athletic. On 3 December, he returned to Gretna and scored six goals in his eleven SPL games for the bottom club.

Real Salt Lake
On 26 February 2008, Deuchar signed with Major League Soccer side Real Salt Lake. His final game with Gretna saw him score 2 goals against Rangers, but Gretna lost 4–2. He made his debut for his new club as a 70th-minute substitute for Real Salt Lake in their 1–1 draw with Chicago Fire on 29 March 2008. He went on to score his first goal in a 3–1 defeat away at the hands of CD Chivas USA on 5 April 2008. Deuchar helped RSL to their first playoff appearance in their history and on to the Western Conference Final appearing in 30 of the team's 33 games that season.

Hamilton Academical
On 19 January 2009, Deuchar joined SPL side Hamilton Academical on a short-term contract. He made his debut for the club on 7 February in a Scottish FA Cup victory against Dundee United. He went on to appear ten times for the club, but without scoring.

St Johnstone (second spell)
On 4 June 2009, Deuchar signed for SPL newcomers St Johnstone, eighteen months after being on loan to the club. He scored the first goals during his second spell at St Johnstone when he bagged a brace against Stenhousemuir in the League Cup. He scored a further goal against Forfar in the Scottish Cup before scoring his first league goal of the season in a 1–0 win over Hearts. In total he made forty appearances, scoring ten goals making him joint top scorer for the club that season with Liam Craig.

Falkirk (second spell)
Deuchar returned to his original club, Falkirk, on 1 July 2010. He made his second debut for the club on 7 August against Dunfermline, and scored his first goal on 11 September in a 3–1 win against Queen of the South. He made only five starts for the club and scored three times.

Livingston
He joined Livingston on 18 January 2011 after being released by Falkirk and scored a hat-trick on his debut the same day in a 4–2 win over East Fife.
On 9 August 2011 he became the first Livingston player to score two hat-tricks for the club in the emphatic 5–0 victory over Stirling Albion in the second round of the Challenge Cup.

Stenhousemuir
He joined Stenhousemuir in February 2012 on loan until the end of the season.

Arbroath
On 11 February 2014, Deuchar came out of footballing retirement to join Arbroath until the end of the season.

Outside football

Deuchar is a company director in Town House Restaurants Ltd which owns and operates the Wheelhouse restaurant, located close to the Falkirk Wheel in Falkirk and the Boathouse restaurant at Auchinstary basin, in Kilsyth.

Career statistics

Honours

East Fife
 Scottish Third Division promotion (1): 2002–03

Gretna
 Scottish Third Division (1): 2004–05
 Scottish Second Division (1): 2005–06
 Scottish Cup Runner- up (1): 2006
 Scottish First Division (1): 2006–07

St Johnstone
 Scottish Challenge Cup (1): 2007–08

Livingston
 Scottish Second Division (1): 2010–11

References

External links

1980 births
Footballers from Stirling
Living people
21st-century Scottish medical doctors
Association football forwards
Scottish footballers
Scottish expatriate footballers
Scottish expatriate sportspeople in the United States
Expatriate soccer players in the United States
Falkirk F.C. players
East Fife F.C. players
Gretna F.C. players
Northampton Town F.C. players
St Johnstone F.C. players
Real Salt Lake players
Hamilton Academical F.C. players
Livingston F.C. players
Camelon Juniors F.C. players
Stenhousemuir F.C. players
Arbroath F.C. players
Scottish Junior Football Association players
Scottish Premier League players
Scottish Football League players
Scottish Professional Football League players
Major League Soccer players
English Football League players